Jnana Deepa (JD), Institute for Philosophy and  Theology (Pontifical Athenaeum) is located at Pune, India. It is the academic component of Papal Seminary, Pontificium Athenaeum Kandiensis seu Pooniensis. Established by the Jesuits in Kandy (Sri Lanka) in 1893, it was transferred to Pune (India) in 1955. Catering primarily to the formation of candidates to the Catholic priesthood it is run by the Society of Jesus for the education and formation of future Catholic leaders.

History
JD is the Athenaeum of the Papal Seminary which was founded in 1893 at Kandy, Sri Lanka. The seminary was founded by the Apostolic Delegate to India,  Mgr Lasdislaus Zaleski and the Belgian Jesuits (Fr Sylvain Grosjean) in response to the letter Ad extremas of Pope Leo XIII calling for the establishment of institutes for the training of the local clergy. Sri Lanka, with India and Burma was then part of the British Empire. After Indian Independence, it became increasingly difficult for Indian citizens to go to Sri Lanka for studies. In 1955, the Papal Seminary along with its Athenaeum moved to Pune, Maharashtra (India), and merged with the academic section of the Jesuit 'De Nobili College'.

The Athenaeum of the Papal Seminary adopted the Indian name 'Jnana Deepa' in 1972. In 2015 it celebrated its diamond jubilee of transfer to Pune. It continues to offer philosophy and theology courses for those studying for the Catholic priesthood. It also serves as an intellectual centre for the Catholic Church in India, having taken a leading role in promoting inculturation since the 1970s. Its "Department of Indian Studies" brings "Indian" insights to the Christian faith.

Programs
In the 1970s and 1980s  JD was the driving force for inculturation, inter-religious dialog, and "liberation theology" for the Indian church. Personalities like Richard De Smet, George Lobo, and George-Soares Prabhu enabled JD to lead a Catholic movement toward the concerns of the poor and marginalised in Indian society. Sara Grant taught philosophy and theology at the institute.

JD has continued in its pioneering activities in the Indian catholic church, for more than a decade pursuing dialog between science and religion. It offers a Licentiate in Science and Religion (MSPR). More practical, contextual studies in sacred scripture have seen a revival, with the addition of a Licentiate programs in contextual spirituality. Diploma and Licentiate Programme in Ignatian Spirituality began in the academic year 2016–17. Also, a pastoral management course was instituted for the administrative and service sector. It publishes an interdisciplinary quarterly, Jnanadeepa: Pune Journal of Religious Studies.

Eminent faculty
 Richard De Smet, Indology. See the Memorial Lecture
 Jean de Marneffe, Systematic Philosophy. See the Memorial Lecture
 George Lobo, Ethics
 George Soares-Prabhu, Scriptures
 John Vattanky, Indology, Navya Nyaya philosophy
 Salvino Azzopardi, Systematic Philosophy
 Kurien Kunnumpuram, Ecclesiology
 Cyril Desbruslais, Systematic Philosophy, philosophy of liberation
 Francis Pereira, Sacred Scripture
 Errol D'Lima, Systematic Theology
 Noel Sheth, Indian Philosophy
 Rui de Menezees, Scripture
 Francis X D'Sa, Indian Studies
 Jacob Kavunkal SVD, Mission, Culture and Religions
 John Felix Raj, Alumnus, Vice Chancellor, St. Xavier's University, Kolkata
 Paul Fernandes, Business Administration
 Paul Parathazham, Sociology
 Kuruvilla Pandikattu, Anthropology, Science-Religion

See also
 List of Jesuit sites

References

External links
 Official website
  Science-Religion Dialog Centre, ASSR, at JD
 St. Xavier's College, Jaipur

Education in Pune
Educational institutions established in 1883
Christian and Hindu interfaith dialogue
Philosophy schools
Jesuit universities and colleges in India
1883 establishments in India
Christian seminaries and theological colleges in India